Oleh Vadymovych Boroday (born 7 January 1993) is a Ukrainian professional football centre-back who plays for Obolon Kyiv.

He made his debut for Olkom Melitopol in the Ukrainian Second League in 2010. He then signed a contract with FC Zorya and made his debut in this team as a substitute in second half in a match against KF Laçi in 2014–15 UEFA Europa League on  17 July 2014.

References

External links 

1993 births
Living people
People from Melitopol
Ukrainian footballers
Ukrainian expatriate footballers
SC Olkom Melitopol players
FC Zorya Luhansk players
PFC Sumy players
FC Poltava players
FC Karpaty Lviv players
Górnik Łęczna players
FC Kramatorsk players
FC Obolon-Brovar Kyiv players
FC Kremin Kremenchuk players
Ukrainian Premier League players
Ukrainian First League players
Ukrainian Second League players
II liga players
III liga players
Association football defenders
Expatriate footballers in Poland
Ukrainian expatriate sportspeople in Poland
Sportspeople from Zaporizhzhia Oblast